Hyperlais argillacealis is a species of moth in the family Crambidae described by Philipp Christoph Zeller in 1847. It is found in Croatia, the Republic of Macedonia, Greece and on Sicily and Crete.

References

Moths described in 1847
Cybalomiinae
Moths of Europe